The 2010 Fujitsu V8 Supercars Series was an Australian motor racing competition for V8 Supercars. It was the eleventh running of the V8 Supercar Development series. The series supported the 2010 V8 Supercar Championship Series, beginning on 11 March at the Clipsal 500 and ending on 5 December at the Sydney 500 after seven rounds.

Steve Owen won the series with a race in hand with victory in the first race at the 2010 Sydney Telstra 500. Owen, driving a Holden VE Commodore for Greg Murphy Racing placed in the top three in six of the seven rounds held, including round wins at the Adelaide, Queensland, Sandown and Sydney rounds, achieving eight race wins in total. It was the first time a Greg Murphy Racing driver had won the series.

Second place was attained by Tim Blanchard, driving a Ford BF Falcon for Sonic Motor Racing Services. He held onto a gap of 47 points over James Moffat. Walkinshaw Performance driver Nick Percat finished fourth, 27 behind Moffat and 9 ahead of MW Motorsport driver David Russell, who fell from third in the series with poor finishes in Sydney.

David Russell took victory at the Bathurst 1000 support round with two race victories, as well as scoring addition race wins at Winton and Sandown. Tim Blanchard, won the Townsville round, also winning his first Fujitsu Series race. Other race wins were mostly claimed by guest drivers making brief appearances in the series ahead of endurance co-driving roles in the Phillip Island 500K and Bathurst 1000 races, with wins being taken by Cameron McConville (2), Paul Morris and Jack Perkins. Taz Douglas took the remaining race win, the reverse grid race at Sandown.

Calendar

The 2010 Fujitsu V8 Supercar Series consisted of seven rounds:

Teams and drivers
The following teams and drivers competed in the 2010 Fujitsu V8 Supercar Series.

 – Paul Morris was a last minute entry in Round 1 in the #66 car after the regular driver Phill Foster failed to qualify.

Points system
Points were awarded only to drivers who completed 75% of race distance and were running on the completion of the final lap. Points were awarded on the following basis.

Driver standings

See also
2010 V8 Supercar season

References

Further reading
 Main Men in a Private World, The Speedcafe Annual – Australian Motorsport – Number 6/2010, pages 58 to 62

External links
 2010 V8 Supercars Operations Manual Rules – Division “D” – Sporting Rules, www.v8supercars.com.au, as archived at web.archive.org
 Series Points Report, racing.natsoft.com.au, as archived at web.archive.org

Fujitsu V8 Supercars Series
Supercars Development Series